Learning to Crawl is the third studio album by British-American rock band The Pretenders. It was released on 21 January 1984 after a hiatus during which band members James Honeyman-Scott and Pete Farndon died of drug overdoses. The album's title of "Learning to Crawl" was given in honor of Chrissie Hynde's then-infant daughter, Natalie Rae Hynde. She was learning to crawl at the time that Hynde was trying to determine a title for the album.

Learning to Crawl was a critical and commercial success, reaching number 11 on the UK Albums Chart. In the United States, it peaked at number five on the Billboard 200, making it the band's highest-charting album in the US.

Production
After Farndon's dismissal from the band and Honeyman-Scott's death, Chrissie Hynde and Martin Chambers initially recruited Rockpile's Billy Bremner and Big Country's Tony Butler to fill in a caretaker line-up of the band in 1982. Bremner played guitar and Butler played bass on the band's September 1982 single "Back on the Chain Gang" and its B-side "My City Was Gone", both songs which were later included on Learning to Crawl. As the album sessions got underway, Bremner, Graham Parker's bass player Andrew Bodnar, and Paul Carrack (formerly of Squeeze, Ace and Roxy Music) played guitar, bass and piano respectively for the track "Thin Line Between Love and Hate".

Finally, Robbie McIntosh (guitar) and Malcolm Foster (bass) were recruited to join Hynde and Chambers, and the band was now officially a quartet. It was this line-up that recorded the rest of the tracks featured on Learning to Crawl.

The November 1983 single "2000 Miles" was the newly reconstituted foursome's first release, followed shortly by the full Learning to Crawl album in January 1984.

Song origins
Hynde noted in the booklet for the expanded edition of Learning to Crawl that guitarist Robbie McIntosh came up with the opening guitar riff for "2000 Miles". She stated that she probably should have credited McIntosh as co-writer of the song.

"2000 Miles" became a popular Christmas song in the UK. The lyrics are a tale of two lovers apart during Christmastime.

In "I Hurt You", dubbing was used to overlap two lead vocal parts with conflicting melodies and emotional pitches in order to express the narrator's tangled emotions.

"My City Was Gone" is largely an autobiographical song written about the changes that Hynde observed when she went back to her native city of Akron, Ohio. The instrumental introduction of the song would later be adopted as the theme of the EIB Network radio brand, originally Rush Limbaugh and later Clay Travis and Buck Sexton.

"Thumbelina" is a country rock song about a mother and daughter traveling across America, with the last line suggesting that the mother is leaving her husband.

"Watching the Clothes" was an older song written before the band's debut album. Hynde was inspired to write the song after a close friend died.

Track listing
All songs written by Chrissie Hynde, except where noted.

 "Middle of the Road" – 4:08
 "Back on the Chain Gang" – 3:44
 "Time the Avenger" – 4:47
 "Watching the Clothes" – 2:46
 "Show Me" – 4:00
 "Thumbelina" – 3:12
 "My City Was Gone" – 5:14
 "Thin Line Between Love and Hate" (Richard Poindexter, Robert Poindexter, Jackie Members) – 3:33
 "I Hurt You" – 4:27
 "2000 Miles" – 3:30

Bonus tracks (2007 Re-release)
 "Fast or Slow (The Law's the Law)" (Martin Chambers) – 3:15
 "Tequila" – 3:35
 "I Hurt You" (Denmark Street demo, August 1982) – 4:06
 "When I Change My Life" (Denmark Street demo, August 1982) – 4:43
 "Ramblin' Rob" (Denmark Street demo, August 1982) (Robbie McIntosh) – 3:32
 "My City Was Gone" (Live) – 4:53
 "Money (That's What I Want)" (Live at US Festival, May 1983) (Berry Gordy Jr., Janie Bradford) – 4:39

Personnel
The Pretenders
Chrissie Hynde – lead vocals (all but "Fast or Slow" and "Ramblin' Rob"), rhythm guitars, harmonica [uncredited], backing vocals
Robbie McIntosh – lead and rhythm guitars, backing vocals
Malcolm Foster – bass guitar, backing vocals
Martin Chambers – drums, backing vocals, lead vocals on "Fast or Slow", percussion
Additional personnel
Billy Bremner – lead guitars on "Back on the Chain Gang" and "My City Was Gone", rhythm guitar and backing vocals on "Thin Line Between Love and Hate"
Tony Butler – bass guitar on "Back on the Chain Gang" and "My City Was Gone"
Andrew Bodnar – bass guitar and backing vocals on "Thin Line Between Love and Hate"
Paul Carrack – piano and backing vocals on "Thin Line Between Love and Hate"
Technical
Steve Churchyard – engineer
Peter Barrett – art direction
Paul Cox – front cover photography

Charts

Certifications

References

The Pretenders albums
1984 albums
Albums produced by Chris Thomas (record producer)
Sire Records albums